Rachel Keke Raïssa (born 30 May 1974) is an Ivorian-born French politician and former chambermaid. A member of the National Assembly since 2022, she represents the 7th constituency of the Val-de-Marne department. She is a member of La France Insoumise (LFI).

Early life 
Keke was born on 30 May 1974 in Abobo, Ivory Coast. Her father was a bus driver and her mother sold clothing, until her death when Keke was 12. Her grandfather fought with the French forces during World War II. At the age of 16, she began working as a hairdresser and other little jobs.

Keke moved to France in 2000 (following the 1999 Ivorian coup d'état that overthrew Henri Konan Bédié), taking up a job as a hairdresser in the hair salon of a relative, also finding work as a chambermaid and housekeeper. She was naturalised as a French citizen in 2015.

Career

Union leader 
A CGT trade union representative between 2019 and 2021, she was one of the leaders of a successful  at the Ibis hotel in Batignolles, Paris. Twenty workers, employed as subcontractors, struck for better pay and improved working conditions beginning in July 2019, and signed an agreement winning virtually all their demands in May 2021.

2022 elections 
In the first round of the 2022 French legislative election, Keke was a candidate for La France Insoumise (LFI) on the New Ecological and Social People's Union (NUPES) slate, the left-wing alliance of political parties. Running for the 7th constituency of the Val-de-Marne department, Keke finished first with 37.22% of the vote; Roxana Maracineanu, former Sports Minister and Olympic silver medalist swimmer, came in second, making the runoff with 23.77%. Keke's campaign focused on outreach to non-voters, while Maracineanu called for a "republican front against the far left"; this drew criticism from the NUPES who saw this as equating them with France's extreme right. In the second and final round, Keke won by 177 votes, scoring 51.38% of the vote against 48.62% for Maracineanu. A profile by France24 noted that Keke's election (along with other newly elected deputies such as Rassemblement national's Katiana Levavasseur) indicated a growing trend of elected politicians from lower economic backgrounds taking up office.

Personal life
Keke has five children. In 2016, she married Bobby Yodé, a zouglou musician.

References

1974 births
Living people
Deputies of the 16th National Assembly of the French Fifth Republic
Ivorian people
Trade unionists from Paris
La France Insoumise politicians
Naturalized citizens of France
French people of Ivorian descent
People from Abidjan
Black French politicians